Amaro Rocha Nascimento Neto (Vitória, Espírito Santo, Brazil, December 4, 1976) is a journalist, sportscaster, editor, television presenter, radio broadcaster and Brazilian politician. He worked in communications companies in Espírito Santo and outside the state.

Political life 
In 2014, he was the state deputy elected with the highest number of state votes, with 55,408 votes.

Amaro disputed the second round of the 2016 municipal elections of Vitória, by Solidariedade (SDD), against Luciano Rezende, of PPS, current mayor of the city. Amaro obtained 48.81% (91,034) of the votes, against 51.19% of his opponent in the second round.

Television presenter 
Since 2009, Amaro has presented the "Balanço Geral" program, on TV Vitória, an affiliate of RecordTV in Espírito Santo. In 2012, he made a stop at Band Minas, in Belo Horizonte, where he presented the Brasil Urgente local. But in 2014, he returned to Espirito Santo to apply for the position of state deputy, where he was the most voted of the state. Some of his well-known television antics is singing funks while presentating a news report.

Television shows 

 Sucesso dos Bairros – Rádio Tropical
 Bom Dia Alegria – Transamérica Hits (Alfredo Chaves)
 Ronda Policial – Rádio Espírito Santo
 Balanço Geral – TV Vitória
 Brasil Urgente – Band Minas

References 

1976 births
Brazilian journalists
Brazilian television presenters
People from Vitória, Espírito Santo
Espírito Santo politicians
Solidariedade politicians
Members of the Chamber of Deputies (Brazil) from Espírito Santo
Outsider musicians
Living people
Republicans (Brazil) politicians